The Dry Canyon Sandstone Member is a geologic formation in California. It is the oldest member of Calabasas Formation.

References

Geologic formations of California